Donald Slack (16 July 1896 – 23 September 1973) was a British athlete. He competed in the men's decathlon at the 1924 Summer Olympics.

References

External links
 

1896 births
1973 deaths
Athletes (track and field) at the 1924 Summer Olympics
British decathletes
Olympic athletes of Great Britain
People from Upton-upon-Severn
Olympic decathletes
Sportspeople from Worcestershire